Lost Dauphin State Park is a state park in Brown County, Wisconsin. It is located on the land that Lost Dauphin claimant Eleazer Williams lived in the mid-19th-century. The park became a state park in 1947. It was removed from the list of state parks but the land remains state-owned.

Location
The park is located at the home of Eleazar Williams overlooking the Fox River. It is located on Brown County Highway D (which is also called Lost Dauphin Road) along the north side of the river.

State park
The park was added to the list of state parks in 1947.  It remains designated as Lost Dauphin Park with the land remaining state owned.

Features
The site features a scenic overlook of the Fox River with a bench, shelter, and swings. The flagstone foundation of the former house remains visible. Since the park is operated locally by the Town of Lawrence, a vehicle admission sticker is not required.

References

External links

Page on Wisconsin DNR website

Protected areas of Brown County, Wisconsin
History of Wisconsin
State parks of Wisconsin